Zapada is a genus of spring stoneflies in the family Nemouridae. There are at least 10 described species in Zapada.

Species
 Zapada chila (Ricker, 1952)
 Zapada cinctipes (Banks, 1897) (common forestfly)
 Zapada columbiana (Claassen, 1923) (Columbian forestfly)
 Zapada cordillera (Baumann and Gaufin, 1971)
 Zapada frigida (Claassen, 1923)
 Zapada glacier (Baumann and Gaufin, 1971)
 Zapada haysi (Ricker, 1952)
 Zapada katahdin Baumann and Mingo, 1987
 Zapada oregonensis (Claassen, 1923) (Oregon forestfly)
 Zapada wahkeena (Jewett, 1954)

References

Further reading

 Arnett, Ross H. (2000). American Insects: A Handbook of the Insects of America North of Mexico. CRC Press.

External links
 NCBI Taxonomy Browser, Zapada

Nemouridae
Plecoptera genera